State Highway 338 (SH 338)  is a  state highway in the U.S. state of Texas.  The highway begins at a junction with U.S. Highway 259 (US 259) in Rocky Branch and heads north to a junction with State Highway 77 (SH 77) in Naples.

History
SH 338 was designated on November 22, 1940, to serve as a route between Rocky Branch and Naples.

Route description
SH 338 begins at a junction with US 259 in Rocky Branch. It heads north from this junction to an intersection with FM 161. SH 338 reaches its northern terminus at SH 77 in Naples.

Junction list

References

338
Transportation in Morris County, Texas